Vierfontein is a settlement in Fezile Dabi District Municipality in the Free State province of South Africa. Vierfontein is a coal-mining village, formerly associated to the Vierfontein Power Station, which was active from 1953 to 1990. When the power station was decommissioned, the village was sold to a property developer. The abandoned fuel station was used in the film "Orkney snork nie".

Directly translated to English from Afrikaans, the name literally means "four fountains".

References

Populated places in the Moqhaka Local Municipality